With the decreased cost and increased capabilities of computers, Nuclear Engineering has implemented computer software (Computer code to Mathematical model) into all facets of this field. There are a wide variety of fields associated with nuclear engineering, but computers and associated software are used most often in design and analysis. Neutron Kinetics, Thermal-hydraulics, and structural mechanics are all important in this effort. each software need to test and verify before use. The codes can be separated by use and function. most of software's written in C and Fortran.

Monte Carlo Radiation Transport
Geant4
MCCARD
MCNP
OpenMC - https://github.com/openmc-dev/openmc
PHITS - https://phits.jaea.go.jp/
SCALE(KENO V and KENO VI) - https://www.ornl.gov/scale
Serpent
TRIPOLI-4 - http://www.cea.fr/nucleaire/tripoli-4

Transmutation, fuel depletion

ACAB code Activation and Transmutation calculations for nuclear applications
ORIP_XXI code  Isotope transmutation simulations
ORILL Code 1D transmutation, fuel depletion (burn-up) and radiological protection code
FISPACT-II Multiphysics, inventory and source-term code
MURE Serpent-MCNP Utility for Reactor Evolution
VESTA Monte Carlo depletion interface code

Toolkit

PyNE The Nuclear Engineering Toolkit - https://pyne.io/

Deterministic Radiation Transport

CASMO5 - https://www.studsvik.com/our-solutions/products/casmo/
HELIOS-2 - https://www.studsvik.com/our-solutions/products/helios-2/
SCALE - https://www.ornl.gov/scale
MPACT - https://www.ornl.gov/division/rnsd/projects/mpact
THOR - https://github.com/NCSU-NCSG/THOR
nTRACER

Steady-state Reactor Analysis

SIMULATE5 - https://www.studsvik.com/our-solutions/products/simulate5/

Spatial Kinetics

PARCS - https://engineering.purdue.edu/PARCS
SIMULATE-3K - https://www.studsvik.com/our-solutions/products/simulate3-k/
NESTLE - http://necluster.engr.utk.edu/nestledev
Citation - http://www.oecd-nea.org/tools/abstract/detail/nesc0387

Thermal-Hydraulics
ATHLET https://www.grs.de/en/computer-code-athlet
TRACE
Idaho National Laboratory's RELAP5-3D
GOTHIC - http://www.numerical.com/software/gothic
FLICA-4
RETRAN (RETRAN-02 and RETRAN-3D)
VIPRE-01
PROTO-FLO
PROTO-HX
PROTO-HVAC
PROTO-Sprinkler

Computational Fluid Dynamics

CFX
FLUENT
StarCD
STAR-CCM+
LOGOS - http://logos.vniief.ru/
COBRA-TF - https://www.ne.ncsu.edu/rdfmg/cobra-tf/
TransAT - https://www.transat-cfd.com/

Severe Accident

 ATHLET-CD - https://www.grs.de/en/simulation-codes/athlet-cd
MELCOR
MAAP - http://www.fauske.com/nuclear/maap-modular-accident-analysis-program

Many codes are supported by the U.S. Nuclear Regulatory Commission (NRC). These include SCALE, PARCS, TRACE (Formerly RELAP5 and TRAC-B), MELCOR, and many others.

http://www.nrc.gov/about-nrc/regulatory/research/safetycodes.html

See also
Safety code (nuclear reactor)
Computational science
Computational physics
Computer simulation
List of software for nanostructures modeling

References

External links
 http://www.min.uc.edu/nuclear/current_research/sinema-research/codes-of-interest
 https://www.nrc.gov/about-nrc/regulatory/research/safetycodes.html
 http://www.oecd-nea.org/tools/abstract/list
 http://www.ne.anl.gov/codes/
 http://www.irsn.fr/EN/Research/Scientific-tools/Computer-codes/Pages/Computer-codes-2624.aspx
Nuclear technology 
Physics software